Arago (minor planet designation: 1005 Arago), provisional designation , is a dark asteroid from the outer regions of the asteroid belt, approximately 55 kilometers in diameter. It was discovered on 5 September 1923, by Russian astronomer Sergey Belyavsky at the Simeiz Observatory on the Crimean peninsula. The asteroid was named after French mathematician François Arago.

Classification and orbit 

Arago orbits the Sun in the outer main-belt at a distance of 2.8–3.5 AU once every 5 years and 8 months (2,058 days). Its orbit has an eccentricity of 0.12 and an inclination of 19° with respect to the ecliptic. The asteroid's observation arc begins at Uccle Observatory in 1935, twelve years after its official discovery observation at Simeiz.

Physical characteristics

Diameter and albedo 

According to the surveys carried out by the Infrared Astronomical Satellite IRAS, the Japanese Akari satellite, and NASA's Wide-field Infrared Survey Explorer (WISE) with its subsequent NEOWISE mission, Arago measures between 48.57 and 68.404 kilometers in diameter and its surface has an albedo between 0.0498 and 0.08. The Collaborative Asteroid Lightcurve Link derives an albedo of 0.0582 and a diameter of 57.69 kilometers based on an absolute magnitude of 9.9.

Lightcurve 

In October 2010, a rotational lightcurve of Arago was obtained from photometric observations that was later submitted to the CALL website. Lightcurve analysis gave a rotation period of 8.7819 hours with a brightness amplitude of 0.22 magnitude. In April 2016, another lightcurve was obtained by the group of Spanish amateur astronomers OBAS. It gave a concurring period of 8.784 hours with an amplitude of 0.22 magnitude.

Spectral type 

Arago is characterized by WISE as a dark and reddish P-type asteroid. It is also a carbonaceous C-type asteroid as generically assumed by CALL.

Naming 

This minor planet was named after French mathematician François Arago (1786–1853) director of the Paris Observatory. He is also honored by an inner ring of Neptune, the crater Arago on the Moon and the crater Arago on Mars. The official naming citation was mentioned in The Names of the Minor Planets by Paul Herget in 1955.

Notes

References

External links 
 Asteroid Lightcurve Database (LCDB), query form (info )
 Dictionary of Minor Planet Names, Google books
 Asteroids and comets rotation curves, CdR – Observatoire de Genève, Raoul Behrend
 Discovery Circumstances: Numbered Minor Planets (1)-(5000) – Minor Planet Center
 
 

001005
Discoveries by Sergei Belyavsky
Named minor planets
19230905